Golden Lotus Award for Best Actress is the main category of Competition of Golden Lotus Awards, awarding to leading actress(es) who have outstanding performance in motion pictures.

Award winners and nominees

2000s

2009 (1st)

2010s

2010 (2nd)

2011 (3rd)

2012 (4th)

2013 (5th)

2014 (6th)

2015 (7th)

2016 (8th)

2017 (9th)

2018 (10th)

2019 (11th)

References

External links

Golden Lotus Awards
Film awards for lead actress
Awards established in 2009
2009 establishments in Macau